José Carlos Meza Pereira (born 7 March 1989) is a Chilean politician who was elected as deputy on 21 November 2021.

Early life
Meza was born in the rural town of San José in Melipilla, where he spent his childhood and part of his adolescence. He was raised in a Catholic family made up of José Meza, a construction worker, and Gloria Pereira, a peasant woman dedicated to temporary fruit picking. José Carlos Meza also has a twin brother and two other siblings. He completed his primary studies at the rural school San José de la Villa, while his secondary studies were at the Liceo Hermanos Sotomayor Baeza in that commune near to Santiago Metropolitan Region.

In 2007, Meza entered the Pontifical Catholic University of Valparaíso to study Law. Fourteen years later, in January 2021, he obtained his law degree from the Chilean Supreme Court.

Political career
At the PUCV he was close to gremialism and became a student leader, being an opponent of the university takeovers then directed by Jorge Sharp.

From 2017 to 2018, he provided legislative advice to María José Hoffmann, deputy for the 2018−2022 period. During that period, he served as executive director of Acción Republicana, then institutionalized wing of José Antonio Kast's conservative social movement.

Later, in 2019, Meza was a founding member of Kast's Republican Party.

References

External links
 

1989 births
Living people
Anti-same-sex-marriage activists
21st-century Chilean lawyers
Chilean Roman Catholics
Pontifical Catholic University of Valparaíso alumni
Republican Party (Chile, 2019) politicians
21st-century Chilean politicians
Chilean anti-communists